"Whiskey in a Teacup" is a song  written and recorded by Canadian country music artist Dean Brody. It was the third single off his extended play Black Sheep, It is one of Brody's seven platinum-certified singles, and was nominated for Single of the Year at the 2020 CCMA Awards.

Critical reception
Top Country named the song "Pick of the Week" for July 4, 2019, stating the "production is a fresh take on gritty that country music needed".

Commercial performance
"Whiskey in a Teacup" was certified Platinum by Music Canada on March 16, 2020, with over 80,000 sales. As of November 2020, the song had received over 9 million streams through Spotify.

Chart performance
"Whiskey in a Teacup" reached a peak of number 3 on the Billboard Canada Country chart dated July 13, 2019. It also peaked at number 69 on the Billboard Canadian Hot 100, his first charting entry there since "Love Would Be Enough" in 2015.

Certifications

References

2019 songs
2019 singles
Dean Brody songs
Songs written by Dean Brody
Open Road Recordings singles
Songs about alcohol